Henry  Lake is a lake located on Vancouver Island south of  Cameron Lake.

References

Alberni Valley
Lakes of Vancouver Island
Dunsmuir Land District